Ludaversal is the eighth studio album by American rapper Ludacris under Def Jam Recordings. It was released on March 31, 2015. Recording sessions took place during 2011 to 2015, while the production on the album was handled by several producers; including Mike Will Made It, Rico Love, Giorgio Tuinfort and Da Internz, among others.

Release and promotion
On March 13, 2012, Ludacris announced the album, titled Ludaversal, would be released on September 11, 2012 (which is on his birthday). One of the songs, titled "Ocean Skies", produced by Capsvl, originally featured vocals from singer Anita Baker. Baker's vocals were later replaced by singer Monica.

On October 9, 2014, Ludacris announced an EP, titled Burning Bridges will be released in December 2014, and then his album Ludaversal will be follow-up on March 31, 2015. On October 31, 2014, Ludacris released the lead single from his EP, titled "Good Lovin" featuring American singer Miguel.

On March 3, 2015, Ludacris held a listening party for Ludaversal with Def Jam. The tracks "Ludaversal (Intro)", "Not Long" featuring Usher and "Come N See Me" featuring Big K.R.I.T. were revealed to the public.

Singles
On December 15, 2014, Ludacris released an EP, titled "Burning Bridges". The final track from the EP, titled "Good Lovin'" featuring Miguel, serves as the lead single from Ludaversal. On March 10, 2015, Ludacris released 2 pre-order tracks from the album titled: "Call Ya Bluff" and "Beast Mode". "Come & See Me" and "Grass Is Always Greener" were both later sent to urban radio to further promote the album.

Critical reception

Ludaversal received generally positive reviews from music critics. At Metacritic, which assigns a normalized rating out of 100 to reviews from critics, the album received an average score of 63, which indicates "generally favorable reviews", based on 11 reviews. Darryl Robertson from XXL called the record "no different" from Ludacris' previous projects, praising his balance of "personal, comical, lyrical, inspirational and socially conscious raps" throughout the track listing, concluding that "[I]f Ludaversal is a reminder that he hasn’t fallen off lyrically, the game should pay attention." AllMusic's David Jeffries said that, "Hip-hop has a towering pile of "the game needs me" albums where an artist returns to stake their claim, but Ludaversal still feels fresh, alive, and needed, and maybe just because it comes from the unique voice that is Ludacris." Jon Dolan of Rolling Stone said of Ludacris on the album: "he's still the same elastically flowing shout-rap dirty bird — gleefully wilding out on Southern party jams like 'Get Lit' and 'Beast Mode'." In a mixed review for Exclaim!, Samantha O'Connor wrote that Ludacris finds himself in between "owning up to the voracious hunger needed to reach a new level of fulfillment and being trapped by the desperation to regain a title that is no longer his."

Commercial performance
The album debuted at number 3 on the Billboard 200 with 73,000 album-equivalent units; it sold 62,000 copies in its first week, and boasted over 4.8 million streams. It was the second best-selling album of the week. It marked Ludacris's eighth top-five album. In its second week, the album fell to number 18 on the Billboard 200, selling 23,000 equivalent album units; it sold 18,000 copies and boasted over 3.4 million streams. For a two-week total, Ludaversal sold just under 82,000 copies and streamed 8 million times domestically.

Track listing

Sample credits
 "Lyrical Healing" contains a sample from "Hubey" performed by Maneesh Bidaye.
 "Ocean Skies" contains a sample from "Diamond on a Landmine" performed by Billy Talent.
 "Not Long" contains a sample from "Tired of Fighting" performed by Menahan Street Band.
 "Charge It to the Rap Game" contains a sample from "Lonnie Blacksmith" performed by Maneesh Bidaye.
 "Money" contains a sample from "All About the Paper" performed by The Dells.
 "In My Life" contains a sample from "Changing Faces" performed by The J.J. Band.
 "This Has Been My World" contains a sample from "Human Nature" performed by Michael Jackson.

Charts

Weekly charts

Year-end charts

References

Ludacris albums
2015 albums
Albums produced by 1500 or Nothin'
Albums produced by Alex da Kid
Albums produced by Da Internz
Albums produced by David Banner
Albums produced by DJ Toomp
Albums produced by Frank Dukes
Albums produced by Illmind
Albums produced by J.U.S.T.I.C.E. League
Albums produced by Just Blaze
Albums produced by Mike Will Made It
Albums produced by T-Minus (record producer)